Mount Arganthonius or Arganthonios, or Arganthon (Ἀργανθών), or Arganthoneion, was a mountain range in ancient Bithynia, which forms a peninsula, and divides the gulfs of Cius and Astacus. The range terminates in a headland which Ptolemy calls Posidium (modern Bozburun). The name is connected with the myths of Hylas and the Argonautic expedition.

Its modern name is Samanli Daği.

References

Bithynia
Arganthonius
Locations in Greek mythology
Ancient Greek geography